Jesús Mansogo Nguema Obono (born 10 August 1997) is an Equatorial Guinean professional footballer who plays as a midfielder for Tunisian Ligue Professionnelle 1 club US Tataouine and the Equatorial Guinea national team.

International career
Mansogo made his international debut for Equatorial Guinea on 28 July 2019.

Notes

References

External links

1997 births
Living people
Sportspeople from Malabo
Equatoguinean footballers
Association football midfielders
Cano Sport Academy players
US Tataouine players
Tunisian Ligue Professionnelle 1 players
Equatorial Guinea international footballers
Equatoguinean expatriate footballers
Equatoguinean expatriate sportspeople in Tunisia
Expatriate footballers in Tunisia